Grumpynators is a Danish band playing Hard Rock inspired by Heavy Metal and Rockabilly. The mixture of the Metal and Old School genres makes a special sound and appearance because an acoustic double bass is used instead of the more traditional electric bass used in Hard Rock genres.

History
Grumpynators was founded in February 2011 by Christian Nørgaard (Guitar) and Emil Øelund (Guitar, Lead Vocals). Soon after Jakob Øelund (Double Bass) and Kasper Jensen (Drums) joined. Christian first met Emil, Jakob and Kasper when Christian was touring with Volbeat as acoustic guitarist and Emil, Kasper and Jakob was Supporting Volbeat with the Neo Rockabilly Band Taggy Tones. In November 2012 Kasper Jensen quit as a drummer in Grumpynators, and Per Fisker, who is a former drummer of Heavy Metal band Jackal joined the band.

Shows
Their first job was at Barnyard Rumble Festival (Denmark) in August 2011. This job was followed by small club jobs in Copenhagen. In March 2012, Grumpynators supported Famous Danish Rock Band Magtens Korridorer on the first part of their spring tour. This was announced in Denmark's biggest Music Magazine Gaffa (magazine) and at Universal Music Denmark's Website. In August 2012 Grumpynators was playing for the second time at the Barnyard Rumble Festival.

Grumpynators was chosen as the support act for Volbeat's "The First 5" tour in Denmark 19–24 February in 2013. This was announced on Volbeat's Facebook page.

Discography
2012 - Grumpynators EP. Originally made for Demo purposes in 200 copies, but was a quite popular sales object at concerts, so an extra production of 300 copies was made. 
2013 - (Planned) Grumpanators second EP (not named) should be ready in February 2013.
2015 Wonderland (debut album)
2017 City of Sin

References

External References
 http://www.grumpynators.dk
 http://bandcamp.grumpynators.dk

Danish hard rock musical groups
Musical groups established in 2011
2011 establishments in Denmark